Vete Manung, also Vetemanu, formerly Goat Island, Île Rocher, Île de la Chèvre or La Chèvre, is a small uninhabited island in Tafea Province of Vanuatu in the Pacific Ocean. Vete Manung Island is located 5.6 km northeast of Pointe Bodiroua on the north-east coast of Erromango Island.

Geography
Goat Island lies 150 km south of Port-Vila.

References

Weblinks 
 Topographic Map Sheet (Erromango)

Islands of Vanuatu
Tafea Province